The 2013 NWSL College Draft was the first annual college draft held by the National Women's Soccer League to assign the NWSL rights of college players to the eight NWSL teams. It took place on January 18, 2013 at the National Soccer Coaches Association of America (NSCAA) Convention in Indianapolis, Indiana.

Format
Draft order was determined by weighted draw based on an evaluation of current team strengths from the NWSL Player Allocation.
The order remains the same each round, as opposed to the originally announced snake format.
Teams will have three minutes to choose a player in each of the first two rounds and five minutes in each of the last two rounds.

Results

Key

Picks

Summary
In 2013, a total of 23 colleges had players selected. By virtue of it being the first NWSL College Draft, all of the following 23 had a player drafted to the NWSL for the first time: Boston College, BYU, Colorado, Dayton, Florida, Florida State, Georgia, Kansas, Maryland, Michigan, Missouri State, North Carolina, Oklahoma State, Penn State, Pepperdine, Portland, Princeton, Stanford, UCF, UCLA, Virginia, Wake Forest and William & Mary.

Schools with multiple draft selections

Selections by college athletic conference

Selections by position

References

See also
 List of NWSL drafts
 List of National Women's Soccer League draftees by college team
 2013 National Women's Soccer League season

National Women's Soccer League drafts
College Draft
NWSL College Draft
2010s in Indianapolis
Soccer in Indiana
Sports in Indianapolis
Events in Indianapolis
NWSL College Draft